Holy Ghost! is an American synthpop duo from Brooklyn, New York City. Founded in 2007, the duo consists of Nick Millhiser and Alex Frankel.

History
Millhiser and Frankel both grew up on the Upper West Side of New York City and attended Trevor Day School together. They were later part of a hip hop group called Automato. Automato's debut album was produced by James Murphy and Tim Goldsworthy of DFA. According to Frankel, after the release of the album, Automato "kind of fell apart". Millhiser and Frankel kept working on music, their collaboration having already begun moving towards the alternative dance genre.

The name Holy Ghost! was selected just before the pressing of their debut single "Hold On" in November 2007. The single was described by Resident Advisor as "one of the dirtiest little Italo tunes you're likely to hear this year".

The duo continued to work on various remixes for the likes of Moby, Cut Copy and MGMT. Their second single, "I Will Come Back" was initially released in conjunction with Mountain Dew's Green Label Sound record label. A video was made for the single that is a shot-for-shot remake of New Order's "Confusion" video, including Arthur Baker reprising his role from the original. The song was later included on the Static on the Wire EP, released on the 18 May 2010. The duo also began to play live, starting with a tour with label mates LCD Soundsystem.

The duo's self-titled debut album was released on April 2, 2011. Their second album, Dynamics, was released on September 3, 2013. The duo's second extended play, Crime Cutz, was released on April 29, 2016. Their third album, Work, was released on June 21, 2019.

Discography

Albums
 Holy Ghost! (2011)
 Dynamics (2013)
 Work (2019)

Extended plays
 Static on the Wire (2010)
 Crime Cutz (2016)

Mix albums
The Remixes Vol. 1 (2009)
Work for Hire (2015)

Singles

Remixes

2007: "Goblin City" by Panthers
2007: "Spectacle Wins" by Only Fools and Horses
2007: "Hearts on Fire" by Cut Copy
2008: "I Love to Move in Here" by Moby
2008: "Business Acumen" by In Flagranti
2008: "Moon Song" by They Came from the Stars I Saw Them
2008: "I Can See" by Jazzanova featuring Ben Westbeech
2008: "Of Moons, Birds and Monsters" by MGMT
2009: "Lisztomania" by Phoenix
2009: "The Deep End" by Curses!
2009: "The Pretender" by Datarock
2009: "I Can See" by Jazzanova
2010: "Drunk Girls" by LCD Soundsystem
2010: "Love Get Out of My Way" by Monarchy
2010: "Somebody to Love Me" by Mark Ronson and the Business Intl
2010: "The Deep End" by Curses!
2011: "Drop Me a Line" by Midnight Magic
2011: "Blue Moon" by Moby
2013: "Working the Midnight Shift" by Donna Summer
2018: "Control (Secretly Sorry)" by JR JR

Members
 Nick Millhiser
 Alex Frankel

Touring members
 Chris Maher – guitar, percussion, background vocals (2010–present)
 Erik Tonnesen – synthesizers, background vocals (2010–present)
 Sam Jones – synthesizers, percussion, background vocals (2011–present)
 Chris Berry - drums (2014–present)
 Jim Orso – drums, background vocals (2011–2014)

References

External links
 

Alternative dance musical groups
American musical duos
DFA Records artists
Electronic music duos
Electronic music groups from New York (state)
Musical groups established in 2007
Musical groups from Brooklyn
Nu-disco musicians
Remixers
American synth-pop groups